LXDE (abbreviation for Lightweight X11 Desktop Environment) is a free desktop environment with comparatively low resource requirements. This makes it especially suitable for use on older or resource-constrained personal computers such as netbooks or system on a chip computers.

Overview 
LXDE is written in the C programming language, using the GTK 2 toolkit, and runs on Unix and other POSIX-compliant platforms, such as Linux and BSDs. The LXDE project aims to provide a fast and energy-efficient desktop environment.

In 2010, tests suggested that LXDE 0.5 had the lowest memory-usage of the four most-popular desktop environments of the time (the others being GNOME 2.29, KDE Plasma Desktop 4.4, and Xfce 4.6), and that it consumed less energy, which suggests mobile computers with Linux distributions running LXDE 0.5 drained their batteries at a slower pace than those with other desktop environments.

LXDE uses rolling releases for its individual components (or for groups of components with coupled dependencies). The default window manager used is Openbox, but one can configure a third-party window manager for use with LXDE, such as Fluxbox, IceWM or Xfwm.
LXDE includes GPL-licensed code as well as LGPL-licensed code.

History 
The project was started in 2006 by Taiwanese programmer Hong Jen Yee, also known as PCMan, when he published PCManFM, a new file manager and the first module of LXDE.

Comparing Linux distribution rankings for DistroWatch in early January 2011 for the year 2010 versus 2009, Ladislav Bodnar noted the increase in popularity of LXDE versus other desktop environments. He said:

Qt port 

Dissatisfied with GTK 3, Hong Jen Yee experimented with Qt in early 2013 and released the first version of a Qt-based PCManFM on 26 March 2013.

On 3 July 2013 Hong announced a Qt port of the full LXDE suite, and on 21 July Razor-qt and LXDE announced that they would merge the two projects. This merger meant that the GTK and the Qt versions would coexist for some time but, eventually, all original team efforts focused on the Qt port, LXQt.

Current development 
Despite the original team moving to LXQt development, some other developers continued to maintain LXDE on GitHub and, as of March 2021, there are fresh commits to keep updated the GTK 2 version. As of July 2019 LXTerminal release is based on GTK 3 to avoid dependencies on the old VTE lib.

GTK 3 port 
As of May 2020, there is an experimental GTK 3 port developed by the Arch Linux community.
GTK 3 versions have already been developed for the following components: LXAppearance, LXAppearance-ObConf, LXDE-common, LXDE-icon-theme, LXDM, LXhotkey, LXInput, LXLauncher, LXPanel, LXRandR, LXSession, LXTask, LXTerminal, Openbox, PCManFM. One advantage of using GTK 3 is that GTK 3 programs run natively on Wayland. PCManFM is a popular file manager for use with tiling window managers and hence, having a Wayland-native PCManFM is useful for people that use Sway.

Availability

Default desktop
Knoppix
LXLE Linux
Raspberry Pi OS
Trisquel Mini

Alternate desktop
Arch Linux
Artix Linux
Debian
Devuan
Fedora

Former default desktop
Lubuntu (replaced by LXQt in 2018)
Artix Linux (now available as an alternate desktop)
Peppermint OS (replaced by Xfce in 2022)

Software components of LXDE 

Unlike other major desktop environments such as GNOME, the components of LXDE have few dependencies and are not tightly integrated. Instead, they can be installed independently of each other or LXDE itself.

See also 

 Xfce – Another lightweight X11 desktop environment
 Comparison of X Window System desktop environments

References

External links 

 
 

 
2006 software
Desktop environments based on GTK
Free desktop environments